Ghana competed at the 2019 World Championships in Athletics in Doha, Qatar, from 27 September–6 October 2019.

Results
(q – qualified, NM – no mark, SB – season best)

Men 
Track and road events

Women 
Track and road events

References

Nations at the 2019 World Athletics Championships
World Championships in Athletics
Ghana at the World Championships in Athletics